The History of Scottish Theology is a three-volume collection of essays published by Oxford University Press in 2019 and edited by David Fergusson and Mark W. Elliott.

References

Christianity in Scotland
Oxford University Press books
2019 non-fiction books
History books about Christianity
Christian theology books